Neocollyris rhodopus is a species of ground beetle in the genus Neocollyris in the subfamily Carabinae. It was described by Bates in 1878.

References

Rhodopus, Neocollyris
Beetles described in 1878